Toni Haimi is a Finnish guitarist originally from Hamina, Finland. As Toni Sailor he is the current guitarist of British electronica band Sohodolls, which he joined in 2004.

All About Eve

He is also famous for being the most recent guitarist of All About Eve, which he joined in the Spring of 2002 after the departure of Marty Willson-Piper earlier in that year.  He remained with the band until their 2004 split.  With All About Eve, he is most apparent on their album/video release Cinemasonic and he was also guitarist on their latest single "Let Me Go Home".  He did not play any part in the album Iceland as this was an entirely Regan/Cousin endeavour.

Early career

Prior to All About Eve he was a member of Nozzle (since 2001) and before that he was a founder member of British indie rockers Malluka. He started out in his native Finland with Lowdown Shakin' Chills, which he joined 1991. Lowdown Shakin' Chills made two albums to Hiljaiset Levyt.

References

Nozzle official site
History of Lowdown Shakin' Chills

Finnish guitarists
Finnish male guitarists
Living people
Year of birth missing (living people)
People from Hamina
All About Eve (band) members